Maksum-ul-Hakim was a jurist, diplomat and justice of Dhaka High Court in Bangladesh. He was an Advocate General for the government. He was an elected member of the Geneva-based UN Human Rights Committee for Prevention of Discrimination of Minorities. He was one of the judge of famous Agartala Conspiracy Case.

Personal life 
Hakim married Nessima, second daughter of former chief justice of Dhaka High Court Amin Ahmed. They had three daughters (Yasmin, Sonia, and Tania) and one son, Tariq ul Hakim. His only son also became a Dhaka High Court justice.

Death 
Hakim died in Dhaka on 12 October 2005.

References 

1926 births
2005 deaths
University of Calcutta alumni
Bangladeshi judges
Bangladeshi diplomats
People from Khulna District
20th-century Bangladeshi lawyers
Bangladeshi expatriates in Argentina
Bangladeshi expatriates in Sweden
People from Khulna